Black Sheep is a double album by Julian Cope, released on Head Heritage in 2008. It is Cope's twentyfourth solo album and features 11 protest songs across two half-hour CDs. Each CD represents "one side of an LP" with their own titles, Return of the Native and Return of the Alternative. Cope described the album as "a musical exploration of what it is to be an outsider in modern Western Culture".

Track listing

Personnel
Julian Cope – vocals, guitar, bass, Mellotron 400, synthesizer, 30" bass drum, producer, directed by, photography, sleeve painting
Anthony "Doggen" Foster – guitar, bass guitar, harmonica, drums
Christopher Patrick "Holy" McGrail – law council, synthesizer, album design
Ady "Acoustika" Fletcher – vocals, acoustic guitar, photography
Michael O'Sullivan – acoustic guitar, 30" bass drum
Big Nige – law council, blasphemous movie division
Vybik Jon – law council
Chris Olley — engineer
Adam Whittaker — mastering

References

External links
Black Sheep on Discogs.com

2008 albums
Julian Cope albums